Front Row Motorsports (FRM) is an American professional stock car racing team that currently competes in the NASCAR Cup Series and NASCAR Craftsman Truck Series. The team began running part-time in 2004 as Means-Jenkins Motorsports under a partnership with Jimmy Means and restaurant entrepreneur Bob Jenkins, with Jenkins becoming the full team owner in 2005. In the Cup Series, FRM currently fields two Ford Mustang GT teams full-time: The No. 34 for Michael McDowell and the No. 38 for Todd Gilliland and Zane Smith. It also fields the No. 36 part-time for Zane Smith and Todd Gilliland. In the Truck Series, they field the No. 38 Ford F-150 for Zane Smith .

Front Row Motorsports has become known as one of the more prominent small-budget teams in the Cup Series, operating with around 60 employees on a fraction of the budget of larger teams, and with equipment often coming second-hand from other Ford teams such as Roush-Fenway Racing. The team has struggled on most intermediate tracks, however since 2011, the team has become noted for its performance at superspeedways and to a lesser extent short tracks, which rely less on aerodynamic performance. This reputation has grown since the signing of noted restrictor-plate racer David Ragan in 2012, who won the team's first race at Talladega the following year with the help of another skilled plate racer and teammate David Gilliland. FRM has also won with Chris Buescher at the rain-shortened 2016 Pennsylvania 400 at Pocono Raceway and Michael McDowell at the 2021 Daytona 500.

The team has received equipment from Roush Fenway Racing since 2010 and began a technical alliance with Roush in 2016. The team also began receiving technical support from Ford starting in 2016, after receiving limited data from Ford since 2010.

The team was awarded the assets of BK Racing on August 21, 2018, after former owner Ron Devine and a trustee from Union First Bank put the team up for bidding. After purchasing the assets, they ran a No. 23 car for the rest of the season, driven primarily by J. J. Yeley from NY Racing. After the 2018 season ended, this team became the No. 36 team in 2019.

Bob Jenkins
Robert "Bob" Jenkins, the full owner of the team since 2005, resides in Dandridge, Tennessee, and is known for his involvement with in the Yum! Brands family of restaurants. He is not to be confused with the motorsports announcer of the same name. Jenkins currently owns around 150 franchises, including many Taco Bell, Long John Silver's, and A&W locations.  Jenkins also owns Morristown Driver's Services (MDS), a full-service, third-party Logistics Provider, specializing in all phases of transportation management. His family is also the owner of Jenkin's Insurance in Dandridge.

Jenkins began his NASCAR career as a sponsor for a then-Busch Series (now Xfinity Series) entry driven by Brad Teague and fielded by longtime owner Jimmy Means. Jenkins began fielding Cup Series entries in 2004 with Means, taking full ownership of the team in 2005.

The Yum! Brands, most notably Taco Bell and Long John Silver's, as well as MDS often appear on the Front Row cars when the team does not have an outside sponsor, with funds coming from Jenkins himself.

The team shop is currently in Mooresville, North Carolina in the shop that used to house MDM Motorsports and Ranier Racing.

Visual identity
As noted, the team has used Bob Jenkins' franchises as sponsors, offering a distinctive look to many of their cars. In 2006, the team began using an old-style font for its car numbers, modeled after the styles used by teams of the 1960s and 1970s. However, the team dropped this style for a more standard rounded block font in 2008. Midway through the year, the Cup cars switched back to the older styled numbers, while the Nationwide Series car used the newer font through the end of the year (the retro font was used on the team's road course car). In 2009, the Nationwide car also switched back to the older-styled numbers. FRM has used the retro style ever since.

NASCAR Cup Series

Car No. 34 history
Mach 1 Racing (2004–2005)
The No. 34 car made its debut on March 14, 2004, at Atlanta Motor Speedway with Todd Bodine driving the car as the No. 98 Lucas Oil Ford. At the time, the team was owned by Chris Edwards and was known as "Mach 1 Racing". Bodine finished 41st after dropping out within sixteen laps. Bodine drove in eight races with the team that year, along with his brother Geoffrey, Larry Gunselman, Randy LaJoie, Chad Chaffin, and Derrike Cope filling out the driving duties that year, driving a total of 29 races.

In 2005 the team changed numbers to No. 34 and planned to run full-time, but due to sponsorship limitations and lackluster performance by LaJoie, the team only ran a limited schedule. Although it attempted many races, two drivers (Ted Christopher and P. J. Jones) each qualified for a race with the team that year. In the fall of 2005, the team website announced that the team was up for sale, but that was quickly rescinded. Later that year, Front Row Motorsports moved into their shop to operate the No. 34 in addition to their current team.

Multiple drivers (2006–2008)

The combined team began running at the 2006 Daytona 500. Randy LaJoie attempted but failed to qualify for the first two races. The team ran the No. 64 at Daytona but switched back to No. 34 for the second race at California Speedway. Lajoie and teammate  Chaffin swapped rides the next week in Las Vegas and Chaffin would drive for the next eight races. Chaffin would then return to FRM's other car after Kevin Lepage's departure for BAM Racing, one week after FRM purchased the owner points from Peak Fitness Racing and renumbered the No. 92 to No. 61. Chad Blount would then take over the No. 34 car for two races, however, he was unable to get into the field and was released. Carl Long, Greg Sacks, Mike Skinner would attempt the next three races with Skinner making the 3M Performance 400 and finishing 37th on the lead lap. Johnny Miller returned to FRM to run the road course at Infineon. After Blount's release, Long, Sacks, Chaffin, Brian Simo, Kertus Davis, Skinner, and Joey McCarthy attempted races for the team, with Long qualifying at Bristol. Lepage drove the car for the rest of the season and made Martinsville.

The car attempted full-time status in 2007 with Lepage, but after missing the first four races, the team decided to go part-time with Andretti and Chaffin. Lepage swapped places with Andretti and Chaffin at the No. 37 so that Lepage could continue full-time. Chaffin later left the team in early 2007. They tried to make another attempt to run the No. 34 at Texas Motor Speedway with myAutoloan.com as the sponsor, but they failed to qualify for the race.

The 2008 season began with the No. 34 planning to run a full season. The team made the Daytona 500 with Andretti behind the wheel and Makoto's Ginger Dressing brand as the associate sponsor, and manufacturer's support from Chevrolet. Andretti left the team to race in the Indianapolis 500 with Roth Racing and eventually decided to continue in the series. Tony Raines qualified for his first race of the season in the No. 34 Chevrolet Impala SS at Dover but finished 40th after transmission failure. The No. 34 Chevy ran part-time after that, with Chad Chaffin attempting the final races for the team in 2008.

John Andretti (2009)
In 2009, John Andretti drove the car full-time, and the team entered into a partnership with Earnhardt Ganassi Racing. The No. 34 team received owner's points from EGR's defunct No. 15 team, becoming locked in for the first five races of the season. For the Daytona 500, Window World joined as the primary sponsor, and the car was fielded as a fourth EGR entry, with EGR crew chief Steve Lane and several EGR crewmembers tending to the car. The team finished 19th in the race. Window World ended up joining the team for the first five races of the season, and additional races later in the year. The team ran EGR engines at the Daytona 500 and the spring Atlanta race, using Pro Motors Engines otherwise. Steven Lane served as the full-time crew chief and some of the EGR crew became permanent employees. Beyond Window World's involvement, the team ran mostly unsponsored; team owner Bob Jenkins began using the space on the No. 34 Chevrolet Impala SS to advertise his Taco Bell restaurants while seeking a new primary sponsor. Andretti missed two races while he ran the Indianapolis 500, and teammate Tony Raines took his place for those events. Raines quickly earned the team's best solo effort finish to that point with a 25th place at Darlington. With John back at the wheel, the team finished 16th at the Lenox Industrial Tools 301 at New Hampshire Motor Speedway, along with numerous other top-30 finishes throughout the year. At Michigan, race sponsor Carfax jumped aboard the No. 34 Chevrolet as the primary sponsor. The team remained in the top-35 for the entire season which guaranteed the team starts the first five races of 2010.

Travis Kvapil (2010)
For 2010, Travis Kvapil was the primary driver of the No. 34 Long John Silver's car, with the team switching to Ford and Roush/Yates providing engines and support for the team. Steve Lane returned to the Long John Silver's team with Kvapil. John Andretti drove the No. 34 in the Budweiser Shootout and the 2010 Daytona 500 with Window World as the primary sponsor, with Kvapil driving the No. 37 Extenze Ford in place of rookie teammate Kevin Conway. Kvapil and the No. 34 team's best finish of 2010 was an 18th at Talladega in the spring and finished 33rd in owners points after Kvapil, Andretti (both with the LJS crew), Kevin Conway, and Tony Raines (both with the Extenze / A&W Crew) ran races with the number.

David Gilliland (2011)

In 2011, David Gilliland returned to Front Row Motorsports running the No. 34 Taco Bell Ford for the full season. He would go on to finish third in the 2011 Daytona 500, ninth in the 2011 Aaron's 499, and 12th in the 2011 Toyota/Save Mart 350.  The third-place finish at Daytona was the beginning of FRM's noted success on restrictor-plate tracks.

David Ragan (2012–2015)
For 2012, former Roush Fenway Racing driver David Ragan drove the car full-time. Ragan helped the team improve slightly, with a best finish of 4th at Talladega in October.  He recorded two top-10 finishes throughout the season, both at Talladega.

Ragan got the team its first win at Talladega Superspeedway in the 2013 Aaron's 499 on a last-lap pass.  Along with David Gilliland's help, the team was able to finish one-two. The win was also the first for a car using No. 34 since Wendell Scott in 1964. The No. 34 team improved more in 2013 earning sixteen top-25 finishes including the win, a sixth-place finish at the fall Talladega race, and a 12th-place finish at the night race at Bristol.  However, three consecutive engine failures near the end of the season dropped Ragan to 28th in points.

Ragan returned as the driver for 2014, with sponsors CSX and Farm Rich (which sponsored the team's win at Talladega) stepping up their commitments. The team struggled to adapt to the new no ride-height rule for the 2014 season and wasn't helped by the struggles of all the Roush-Yates engines teams all year long. Ragan was outside the top-30 in points near the end of the season. However, the No. 34 car got a boost at the October Martinsville race, when it finally scored its first top 10 of the season. In the race, Ragan drove a tribute baby blue paint scheme dedicated to the late Wendell Scott, the last driver before Ragan to win using the number 34.

Ragan returned to the team in 2015. With KFC sponsoring, Ragan came back from a lap down in his Duel race to qualify for the Daytona 500 (his points had been moved to the No. 35 car), where he later finished 17th. After the 500, Ragan temporarily left the team to drive for Joe Gibbs Racing in place of an injured Kyle Busch. Ragan was originally scheduled to return to the No. 34 upon Busch's return to the series, but in April, circumstances led to him to instead leave for Michael Waltrip Racing to replace an ailing Brian Vickers for the rest of the season.

Brett Moffitt (2015)

Meanwhile, Joe Nemechek took over the No. 34 at Atlanta, the first of an eight-race sponsorship from CSX. Brett Moffitt took over the No. 34 at Las Vegas and Phoenix, with Chris Buescher driving the car for the next four races along with Talladega and Reed Sorenson driving at Richmond. In May 2015, Moffitt, competing for Rookie of the Year honors, was named the driver for the remainder of the season, though Justin Marks took over at Sonoma, Buescher drove the car at Watkins Glen, and Josh Wise ran the fall Talladega race. Despite not running the full season, Moffitt earned Cup Series Rookie of the Year honors.

Chris Buescher (2016)

On December 10, 2015, it was announced that reigning Xfinity Series champion Chris Buescher would drive the No. 34 for the 2016 season, as part of FRM's new alliance with Roush Fenway Racing. Bob Osbourne replaced Derrick Finley as crew chief for the No. 34. Finley then became Front Row's technical director. It was later announced that longtime FRM sponsor Love's Travel Stops would be moving to the No. 34 in 2016 (after sponsoring the No. 38 since 2013). CSX also returned to the team for eight races.
Buescher, in one of the biggest upsets in recent NASCAR history, won a fog-shortened Pennsylvania 400 at Pocono, after taking the lead in the final 15 laps. It was Buescher's first win in the Cup Series and the team's second Cup Series victory. Buescher, with the win, became the first driver since Joey Logano in 2009 to win a race as a Cup Series Rookie of the Year candidate (In 2011, Trevor Bayne won a race during his part-time rookie season but was not running for the Cup Series Rookie of the Year award). Buescher later moved up to 29th in points following Richmond, locking him into the Chase. It was the first-ever Chase berth for a Front Row Motorsports entry. Buescher began the Chase in the 13th position in points, but three sub-par finishes cost him a chance to move on to the 2nd round. He finished 16th in points, a career-best for the team. Buescher later departed for JTG Daugherty Racing following the season's conclusion.

Landon Cassill (2017)

It was announced on December 16, 2016, that Landon Cassill would shift over from the #38 car to replace Buescher. His best finish in the 2017 season was 16th at the Daytona 500. After only one year of having Cassill in the car, it was announced on October 10, 2017, that he would not be returning to the car or Front Row Motorsports.

Michael McDowell (2018–present)

Michael McDowell was later announced as Cassill's replacement for 2018. During the season, he only scored one top-10 finish at the Daytona 500 and ended up 26th in the standings. McDowell started the 2019 season with a fifth-place finish at the Daytona 500, later scoring another top-five at the fall Talladega race.

On December 12, 2019, FRM announced that McDowell will return to the No. 34 for the 2020 season. He scored four top-10s and finished the season 23rd in the standings, a new career best.

McDowell began the 2021 season by winning the 2021 Daytona 500; it was his first NASCAR Cup Series win, in his 358th Cup race. He was a 100-1 underdog. He would go on to finish inside the top 10 in the first three races of the season.

McDowell started the 2022 season with a seventh place finish at the 2022 Daytona 500. He scored seven top-10 finishes during the regular season. On July 26, crew chief Blake Harris was suspended for four races and fined 100,000 for an L2 Penalty during post-race inspection after the 2022 M&M's Fan Appreciation 400 at Pocono. The penalty came under Sections 14.1 C, D and Q and 14.5 A and B in the NASCAR Rule Book, both of which pertain to the body and overall vehicle assembly rules surrounding modification of a single-source supplied part. In addition, the No. 34 team was docked 100 driver and owner points and 10 playoff points.

Car No. 34 results

Car No. 35 history
No. 55 (2011)

In 2011, Front Row Motorsports took over the No. 55 team & equipment from Michael Waltrip Racing to field a research & development car. It debuted at New Hampshire Motor Speedway with Jeff Green starting and parking. J. J. Yeley and Travis Kvapil split time between the 38 and 55 cars for the remainder of the year.

Josh Wise (2012–2013)

In 2012, Michael Waltrip Racing reclaimed the No. 55 for its new entry for Mark Martin and Michael Waltrip; in response, Front Row Motorsports changed to the No. 26. For Daytona, the car was sponsored by presidential candidate Rick Santorum, and driven by Tony Raines. Raines qualified for the race after being one of the three fastest "go or go home" drivers during the first day of qualifying. He finished 19th but ran as high as second. Rookie of the Year candidate Josh Wise took over the car starting at Phoenix and ran the majority of the season as a start-and-park operation. The only full race for the team besides Daytona was at Sonoma Raceway where Wise finished 30th. Despite running the majority of the season, Wise lost the ROTY honors to a late entrant Stephen Leicht.

Starting in 2013, the car number was changed to No. 35, and the team attempted the full schedule with Wise. Due to a lack of sponsorship, the team planned to run 20-30 full races, while starting and parking in the remaining events. Wise picked up sponsorship from Blockbuster Video and Cajun Industries for the Daytona 500, where Wise finished 40th after a crash. Michael McDowell stepped into the car at Watkins Glen International with sponsor Dockside Logistics. A skilled road course racer, McDowell qualified 12th but finished 38th after suspension issues. On November 26, 2013, Wise announced that he would be leaving the team, moving to Phil Parsons Racing.

Multiple drivers (2014)
In 2014, the No. 35 ran with various drivers. Eric McClure attempted the 2014 Daytona 500 with longtime sponsors Hefty and Reynolds Wrap but failed to qualify. Blake Koch attempted the next two races, finishing 37th at Phoenix.  David Reutimann was placed in the car for six races starting at Bristol, making the field at Auto Club, Texas and Richmond.  McClure then returned for the Aaron's 499, where he once again failed to qualify.  The No. 35 did not make another attempt for the rest of 2014.

Cole Whitt (2015)

After several rumors that No. 34 driver David Ragan would be replaced with BK Racing driver Cole Whitt, in January 2015, it was announced that Whitt would move to the No. 35 team, bringing sponsors Speed Stick GEAR (10 races) and Rinnai. Crew chief Randy Cox would also move from BK Racing to head the team. The owner's points for the No. 34 and No. 35 were switched, allowing Whitt a better chance of making races. Whitt successfully qualified for the Daytona 500 and finished 22nd in the race. After an up and down season, Whitt and the No. 35 finished 31st in both driver and owner points at the season's end. In 2016, Whitt moved to Premium Motorsports to drive the No. 98.

David Gilliland (2016)
David Gilliland, who had been ousted from the No. 38 after Landon Cassill took over the ride, attempted the Daytona 500, but failed to qualify.
Gilliland did make the field however for the next restrictor-plate race at Talladega. He started 39th and finished 17th. On July 2, 2016, David Gilliland qualified the #35 car for the Coke Zero 400 at Daytona International Speedway and finished 19th on the lead lap during the race. He then failed to make the fall Talladega race.

Car No. 35 results

Car No. 36 history

J. J. Yeley (2018)
In August 2018, Front Row Motorsports was awarded the assets of BK Racing after making the highest bid at $2.8 million. They were awarded the No. 23 charter and most of the team's equipment. The team continued to use the No. 23 on the cars for the rest of the season with Joey Gase as the driver. Israeli driver Alon Day drove the car at Richmond. The fall race at Talladega was the first time the team fielded the No. 23 as a Ford Fusion, with J. J. Yeley driving it. The team had been running as a Toyota Camry up until then.

Matt Tifft (2019)

On November 27, 2018, FRM announced that the team will be renumbered to 36, with Matt Tifft as the driver for the 2019 season and competing for 2019 Rookie of the Year honors. Tifft selected 36 as his racing number to honor his mentor Ken Schrader, who raced with that number in the Winston Cup Series from 2000 to 2002.

Before the Atlanta race, car chief Brandon Lee was ejected from the track after the No. 36 failed pre-qualifying inspection multiple times. On July 23, 2019, Front Row Motorsports announced that crew chief Mike Kelly of the No. 36 will switch to the No. 38 while Seth Barbour will transfer from the No. 38 to the No. 36 Ford for the remainder of the season. Prior to the Martinsville race, Tifft was rushed to the hospital while Matt Crafton took over the No. 36 for the race weekend. On October 29, Tifft revealed that he blacked out and suffered a seizure in the team's hauler. Because of this, he missed the rest of the season while John Hunter Nemechek took over the No. 36 for the final three races. Tifft formally parted ways with FRM before the end of the season to recover from his medical issues.

On December 12, 2019, FRM announced that the No. 36 team will shut down for the 2020 season, reverting to a two-car operation. The charter was leased to Rick Ware Racing, which uses it for the No. 53 team.  However, David Ragan ran the car as a #36 at the 2020 Daytona 500, finishing 4th.

David Ragan (2021)
On January 6, 2021, it was announced that the 36 would return for the 2021 Daytona 500 with David Ragan behind the wheel. During the race, Ragan would be collected in a crash resulting in a 37th position (Despite finishing 4th in the same race the year prior, while driving for Rick Ware Racing, who used the same number for Ragan's car in said race.)

Zane Smith & Todd Gilliland (2023)
On February 7, 2023, Front Row announced Zane Smith would drive the No. 36 entry for the Daytona 500, As well as the No. 38 entry for 6 races replacing Todd Gilliland in those races.

Car No. 36 results

Car No. 37 history
No. 61 (2006)
In April 2006, Front Row Motorsports purchased the owner points of Peak Fitness Racing. The team originally hired Peak's driver Kevin Lepage to drive however, after just one race, Lepage left Front Row Motorsports, heading to BAM Racing. Chad Chaffin took over the No. 61 car after Lepage's departure. Brian Simo drove the No. 61 car for the road course at Infineon. At the second road course of the season at Watkins Glen, Front Row Motorsports lease out the No. 61 owner points to No Fear Racing and entered the No. 92 with Johnny Miller, but he failed to qualify.  After Watkins Glen, the team ran as No. 61 for the remainder of the season. Chaffin ran most of the rest of the races with Stanton Barrett driving the car at Dover and Lepage made the race at Atlanta.

No. 37 (2007–2009)

The team partnered with No. 37 of R&J Racing in 2007, however, the deal fell through early in the season, although Front Row retained the team's owner's points and car number. Bill Elliott attempted Daytona for the team and John Andretti and Chad Chaffin planned to race the car full-time.  After race 4, Front Row Motorsports announced the No. 34 would run full-time, and that Andretti and Chaffin would swap positions with Lepage so that Lepage could continue full-time. Lepage failed to qualify twenty-five times and left before the end of the season. The 37 attempted the 2008 Daytona 500 with Eric McClure and sponsor Hefty, but the team failed to qualify.

The team returned to the track for the 2009 Daytona 500 with Tony Raines driving, inheriting the points from the No. 34 from the year before as a result of the merger with EGR, but did not qualify. The team has attempted other races since then, making the race at Richmond, and finished the race in 41st only after running 74 laps. They were awarded no points for the race because of being a late entry. The team also made Dover, however a flat tire early in the race ended the team's run and they finished 42nd. Kevin Hamlin attempted to make his Sprint Cup debut in the No. 37 at Kansas, however, did not qualify for the race. Travis Kvapil DNQ'd at Lowes Motor Speedway. The No. 37 was mostly a start and park entry in 2009, although the team ran the full race at Daytona with Tony Raines when they picked up sponsorship from Gander Mountain, and also Homestead with Travis Kvapil when Miccosukee Indian Gaming & Resort sponsored the team after David Stremme failed to qualify in the Phoenix Racing entry. Scott Eggleston crew-chiefed the car for the majority of 2009, with Buddy Sisco acting as chief during the Coke Zero 400 and Peter Sospenzo joining the team during the second half of the season. Road course ringer Tony Ave drove the #37 Long John Silver's car at Watkins Glen, placing 43rd after blowing an engine on lap 8.

Kevin Conway (2010)
For the 2010 season, the No. 37 became a full-time Ford team and rookie Kevin Conway was scheduled to drive the No. 37, with his longtime sponsor Extenze coming on board, with Peter Sospenzo as Crew Chief. The team started in the Top 35 after acquiring owner's points from former Doug Yates cars. Kvapil drove the No. 37 in the 2010 Daytona 500, as NASCAR did not give Conway approval to compete at Daytona due to a lack of superspeedway experience. Conway was unable to keep the car in the top-35 in points, so he, his sponsor, and crew (which is referred to as the Extenze/ A&W crew) would jump to whatever number was highest in points at the time to ensure he and his sponsor would qualify. Conway would eventually be released from FRM, ExtenZe removed from the car, he and his sponsor sued for lack of payment and was replaced with a rotation of NASCAR veterans Tony Raines and Dave Blaney. A&W All American Food would be displayed on the car in ExtenZe's absence, another Jenkins franchise. Peter Sospenzo & his crew remained with the A&W car until Atlanta in September, when Sospenzo and his crew moved over to the Taco Bell car of David Gilliland. Randy Seals and the former Taco Bell crew moved over to the A&W team. The No. 37 car would wind up 33rd in owners points, with Conway having a best finish of 14th at Daytona (one of only 4 finishes better than 30th for him), Blaney having a best finish of 24th at Atlanta, and Raines with a best finish of 28th at Bristol (he was running top-20 at Martinsville before a flat tire ended his day). Gilliland also ran the number occasionally with his Taco Bell crew.

Max Q Motorsports (2011)
For 2011, Robert Richardson Jr. returned to drive the Daytona 500 in the No. 37 with his father's company, North Texas Pipe, sponsoring the ride. Driver Tony Raines spotted him during the race. After Daytona, FRM struck a deal with Larry Gunselman's Max Q Motorsports to manage the No. 37 for the remainder of the year.  Gunselman later purchased all assets of the team and FRM is no longer involved in the No. 37.

Car No. 37 results

Car No. 38 history
David Gilliland (2010)
Front Row Motorsports added a third team in 2010, with David Gilliland as the primary driver and Robert Richardson, Jr. sharing the ride for at least 3 races throughout the year. Randy Seals comes from Richard Petty Motorsports as crew chief. Richardson ran the 2010 Daytona 500 with sponsorship from Mahindra Tractors, with Gilliland displaying Taco Bell for the other races. The team allied with Doug Yates in February 2010 and earned Top 35 exemptions for the first five races of 2010 from a former Yates Racing entry. Gilliland and his Randy Seals lead Taco Bell crew swapped between the No. 38 and No. 37 throughout the season. Kevin Conway and Dave Blaney ran races under No. 38 with the ExtenZe/A&W crew and Kvapil ran races with the No. 38 and his LJS's crew. At Pocono in August, with Kvapil and his then crew chief Steven Lane in the No. 38, it was determined the car had an illegal valve stem in one of the tires, resulting in a 150-point deduction for the No. 38 car, the suspension & fining of crew chief Steven Lane, suspension of car chief Richard Bourgeois and tire specialist Michael Harrold. Steven Lane was released from the team soon thereafter and replaced by Brian Burns on the LJS's team. The team never regained top-35 status, missing races and finishing 36th in points. Gilliland and his Taco Bell crew had a best finish of 19th twice, at Martinsville and Sonoma.

Travis Kvapil (2011)

For 2011, Travis Kvapil returned to FRM to drive the No. 38 Long John Silver's Ford, however, Kvapil opted to run for the Camping World Truck Series championship. The No. 38 was locked into the field following Daytona, as Penske Racing's/Rusty Wallace Racing's No. 77 did not run past Daytona and in turn, gave up its locked-in spot to the No. 38. Bill Henderson joined FRM as crew chief of the No. 38 following a stint at Prism Motorsports in 2010, however parted ways with the team following the race at Las Vegas. Jay Guy joined as crew chief at California.

Kvapil missed two races due to Truck Series obligations, and after the debut of the No. 55 car and the signing of J. J. Yeley, the two drivers split time in both the No. 38 and No. 55 cars for the duration of the season.

David Gilliland (2012–2015)

For 2012, David Gilliland returned to the No. 38, after driving the team's No. 34 in 2011. The team had also signed ModSpace / United Rentals to a multi-race primary sponsorship of the No. 38 beginning at Texas in April. Pat Tryson was the No. 38's crew chief.  The team has also signed Maximum Human Performance to a multi-race sponsorship beginning with the Daytona 500.  FRM would have a variety of other sponsors throughout the season.  Gilliland would end up 28th in points.

In 2013, David Gilliland continued driving the No. 38 full-time for FRM. In the 2013 Aaron's 499, Gilliland pushed teammate Ragan to the checked flag, producing a 1-2 finish for Front Row. Gilliland went on to record two top-10s on the season and finish 26th in points.

In 2014, Gilliland returned to the No. 38.  Love's Travel Stops stepped up their sponsorship of the team to 12 races. The team started the season slowly and struggled, especially at the intermediate tracks. The No. 38 team would rebound and Gilliland won the pole at the summer Daytona race, the first pole for FRM.

Gilliland returned to the No. 38 for 2015, with Love's Travel Stops further stepping up their sponsorship to 18 races. Gilliland began the season by finishing 11th in the Daytona 500. The No. 38 also picked up sponsorship from Farm Rich during Talladega (a sponsor of FRM's No. 34 car). After an up and down season, Gilliland was released from the team after six years.

Landon Cassill (2016)

In 2016, FRM announced an alliance with Roush-Fenway Racing. On January 20, 2016, it was announced that FRM signed Landon Cassill full-time driving the No. 38 Ford, bringing his sponsor Snap Fitness for a few races as well as Florida Lottery. Cassill ended the season finishing 29th in points.

David Ragan (2017–2019)

On December 16, 2016, it was announced that Cassill would shift to the newly open No. 34 car and that David Ragan would rejoin FRM to drive the No. 38. Prior to the 2017 Daytona 500, Ragan acquired sponsorship from Camping World and Jacob Companies. Ragan ended 2017 with three Top 10s and a 30th-place points finish.

Ragan improved vastly in 2018. While he only scored one top 10 finish, at Talladega Superspeedway in the spring, he posted 16 top 20s, including four in the last five races of the season, and finished a team-best 25th in the final points standings.

Ragan returned to the team in 2019. On July 23, 2019, Front Row Motorsports announced that crew chief Mike Kelly of the No. 36 will switch to the No. 38 while Seth Barbour will transfer from the No. 38 to the No. 36 Ford for the remainder of the season. Ragan retired from full-time competition at the end of the 2019 season.

John Hunter Nemechek (2020)
On December 12, 2019, FRM announced that John Hunter Nemechek will replace Ragan as the driver of the No. 38 Ford for the 2020 season and will compete for the 2020 NASCAR Rookie of the Year honors. In addition, Barbour will return as the team's crew chief. Nemechek was the highest-finishing rookie at the Daytona 500, coming home 14th and scoring three top-10s, including two 8th-place finishes at both Talladega races. However, inconsistency plagued the team and he ended the season 27th in points.

On November 16, 2020, Nemechek parted ways with FRM.

Anthony Alfredo (2021)

On January 6, 2021, it was announced that Anthony Alfredo would replace John Hunter Nemechek as the driver of the No. 38 Ford for the 2021 season and will compete for NASCAR Rookie of the Year honors. He finished 30th in the final standings with just one top-ten finish. On November 9, Alfredo parted ways with FRM.

Todd Gilliland (2022)

On November 30, 2021, it was announced that FRM truck series driver Todd Gilliland would replace Alfredo as the driver of the No. 38 Ford for the 2022 season and will compete for Rookie of the Year honors. On March 1, 2022, Barbour was suspended for four races due to a tire and wheel loss during the 2022 WISE Power 400 at Auto Club Speedway.

Todd Gilliland & Zane Smith (2023)
On February 7, 2023, FRM announced that Zane Smith would run five races in the No. 38 Ford in addition to qualifying for the Daytona 500 in the No. 36.

Car No. 38 results

Car No. 92 history
No. 92 (2005–2006)
FRM fielded the No. 92 Chevy for multiple drivers in 2005. It debuted at the 2005 Daytona 500 with Stanton Barrett driving, but it did not qualify. After missing the next three races, the team finally got into a race at the Food City 500 at Bristol Motor Speedway, where Barrett finished 41st after suffering oil pressure problems. After the spring Dover race, Tony Raines drove the car at the Chevy American Revolution 400 at Richmond International Raceway, finishing 35th. Then Hermie Sadler and Eric McClure began sharing the ride, although McClure did not qualify for a race in the car. Johnny Miller ran the car at Watkins Glen, finishing 29th. Another driver, Chad Chaffin, also took over driving duties, failing to qualify in his initial attempt at Martinsville Speedway, and then qualifying 43rd the next week at Atlanta Motor Speedway before surrendering the car to Bobby Hamilton Jr. Late in the year, the team formed an equipment-sharing partnership with Mach 1 Racing, and that eventually turned into the team moving into Mach 1's shop and hiring their old crew.

Chad Chaffin began the 2006 season with the No. 92 team, however, after two races he was moved to the No. 34 team. Chad Blount would then take over the car until Talladega where FRM decided the team shut down the No. 92 operation. The team just made one of the nine races it attempted and cited lack of performance as a reason for the team's shut down.

Car No. 92 results

Nationwide Series
Eric McClure (2008)
In 2008, Front Row Motorsports focused their efforts on the Nationwide Series, with Eric McClure driving the No. 24 Hefty Chevrolet, with a best finish of 15th at Talladega Superspeedway. McClure ran the full season, except for the road courses where Brian Simo ran the No. 24 car.

The team also attempted to buy out the fledgling Specialty Racing team, for a time fielding the No. 61 Cone Solvents Chevrolet with driver Kevin Lepage. However, after the July race at Daytona, Specialty Racing hired Brandon Whitt to drive the No. 61, and returned to Ford, disregarding the supposed buyout, leading Front Row Motorsports and Kevin Lepage to file a lawsuit against the team. McClure, meanwhile, finished the year 21st in points. McClure left the team at the end of the 2008 season, bringing sponsor Hefty and the No. 24 to Team Rensi Motorsports.

Tony Raines (2009–2010)
In 2009, Front Row Motorsports ran the No. 34 Chevrolet Impala SS with veteran Tony Raines returning to the series full-time. Scott Eggleston crew-chiefed the car, who has been with FRM since 2007. The entry was mostly unsponsored, with Jenkins advertising his Long John Silver's franchises on the car. Raines and his team were able to drive to 4th at the Aaron's 312 at Talladega Superspeedway, FRM's first-ever top-ten or top-five in either series, in addition to a fifteenth-place finish at Las Vegas and Richmond. Later in the season, he had a sixth-place finish in the rain at the NAPA Auto Parts 200, and a strong 10th-place finish at Lowes Motor Speedway, finishing the year 12th in drivers points.

It was announced that Front Row Motorsports would lease their Nationwide team, running Chevrolets, to TriStar Motorsports in 2010 after FRM's announcement to become a factory-backed Ford team.  The partnership ended with TriStar Motorsports purchasing all remaining assets of FRM's Nationwide team.  FRM is no longer involved in the Nationwide Series.

Craftsman Truck Series

Truck No. 38 history

Todd Gilliland (2020–2021)
On January 13, 2020, FRM announced they would attempt the full 2020 NASCAR Gander RV & Outdoors Truck Series season with Todd Gilliland driving the No. 38 Ford.

Gilliland returned to the No. 38 in 2021. Todd Gilliland won his second career Truck series at Circuit of the Americas, his first win for FRM.

Zane Smith (2022–present)
On November 30, 2021, it was announced that Zane Smith would drive the No. 38 truck for 2022 season, replacing Gilliland, who moved to the NASCAR Cup Series. Smith began the 2022 season by winning at Daytona. He finished in second place at Las Vegas, but was disqualified after a post-race inspection found a lug nut violation. Following the 2022 CRC Brakleen 150 at Pocono Raceway, Smith clinched the regular season championship. On November 4, Smith claimed his first Truck Series championship after winning at Phoenix. It was also FRM's first championship in any NASCAR division.

Smith began the 2023 season by winning at Daytona for the second year in a row.

Truck No. 38 results

References

External links

Bob Jenkins Sprint Cup owner statistics

2005 establishments in North Carolina
American auto racing teams
Companies based in North Carolina
NASCAR teams